Alliphis siculus is a species of mite in the family Eviphididae. It is found in Europe and New Zealand.

References

Mesostigmata
Articles created by Qbugbot
Animals described in 1905